The Canada Building (built in 1913) is a historic eight-story office block in the Central Business District of Saskatoon, Saskatchewan, Canada. The office building features large bison heads flanking the main doorway.

The office building was built by Allan Bowerman. Bowerman was also responsible for the development of the Bowerman House.

References

Buildings and structures in Saskatoon
Office buildings completed in 1913
1913 establishments in Saskatchewan